Lake Mégantic is a body of water in Québec, located in the Appalachian Mountains near the U.S. border. It is a source of the Chaudière River which drains into the St Lawrence River at Québec City. It is part of Le Granit Regional County Municipality, a rural region where forestry and granite extraction are important activities.

Toponymy 
The name may derive from Namagôntekw, which in the Abenaki language means place where there is trout in the lake. The name has had many variants, including Amaguntik on maps documenting the 1775 American invasion of Quebec.

Physical geography 

Conservation 
It is the site of the Lake Megantic Marsh, a 755 hectare habitat that hosts migratory birds and is a breeding site.

References 

Lakes of Estrie